David Nelson Dillehunt (born April 5, 1984, in Charlottesville, Virginia) is an American film director, television producer and composer.

Career
He is best known as the director of You Can't Do That on Film, the 2004 documentary about the cult-classic children's series, You Can't Do That on Television. Other notable works include his sketch-comedy series, Caught in the Act, the 2008 feature-length comedy, Craptastic, and the 2011 documentary We Are Astronomers, which premiered at the Virginia Film Festival. Dillehunt has released eight albums and five EPs of original music compositions, and is a founding member of the indie rock band Butterfly Vendetta.

Dillehunt is the Deputy Director of Communications & Public Engagement for the City of Charlottesville. Since joining the department in 2005, he has overseen the production of numerous local television series and civic meetings. Dillehunt now manages the PEG cable stations in Charlottesville. He was nominated for a Regional Emmy Award in May 2013 and May 2021 for his work with the department.

Filmography

Discography
Studio albums
Defying Belief (1999)
Caught in the Act (2002)
Somewhere in Between (2005)
Chaos Theory (2008)
Face the Music (2011)
Turn Off Your Mind (2014)
Surrender (2017)
Hindsight (2020)

EPs
David Dillehunt (EP) (1996)
Incognito (EP) (2003)
Playing with Fire (EP) (2009)
Freak Flag (EP) (2015)
Enemies of Love (EP) (2021)

References

External links

Official Site

1984 births
Film directors from Virginia
Living people
Musicians from Charlottesville, Virginia